Mendipathar–Guwahati Passenger is a passenger train belonging to Northeast Frontier Railway zone of Indian Railways that runs between  of Meghalaya and   in Assam. It is currently being operated with 55819/55820 train numbers on a daily basis.

Service

The 55819/Mendipathar–Guwahati Passenger has an average speed of 29 km/hr and covers 129 km in 4 hrs 30 mins. 55820/Guwahati–Mendipathar Passenger has an average speed of 34 km/hr and 129 km in 3 hrs 45 mins.

Route and halts

Traction

Both trains are hauled by a WDM-3A diesel locomotive based at the New Guwahati Locomotive Shed.

Coach composition

The train consists of 13 ICF coach:

 13 General-class
 2 Second-class Luggage/parcel van

Direction reversal

The train reverses its direction 1 times:

See also 

 Mendipathar railway station
 Guwahati railway station
 Dudhnoi–Mendipathar line

References

External links
 MNDP/Mendi Pathar
 55819/Mendipathar–Guwahati Passenger
 55820/Guwahati–Mendipathar Passenger

Rail transport in Meghalaya
Slow and fast passenger trains in India
Rail transport in Assam
Transport in Guwahati
Railway services introduced in 2014
2014 establishments in India